Ruan Dacheng ( 1587–1646) was a Chinese dramatist, poet and official during the Ming dynasty. His daughter, Ruan Lizhen, was also a dramatist. 

Ruan grew up in Huaining County, Anqing. He became a jinshi in 1616 and began a career as an official. Ruan aligned himself with the faction of the eunuch Wei Zhongxian and, after Wei fell from favour and committed suicide, was removed from office. He then retired to live as a hermit and it is believed that most of his literary production was undertaken during this time. 

In 1644, after the fall of Beijing to the invading Manchus, he became an official of the Southern Ming dynasty through the influence of his close friend Ma Shiying. In 1645 he surrendered to the Manchus.

After his death, he was reviled as a traitor and he is a villain in Kong Shangren's The Peach Blossom Fan. 

He was a patron of the garden designer Ji Cheng.

See also 
 Hanjian

References 

Ming dynasty politicians
1580s births
1646 deaths
Politicians from Tongling
Grand Secretaries of the Ming dynasty
Ming dynasty dramatists and playwrights
Poets from Anhui
Ming dynasty poets
Qing dynasty people
17th-century Chinese dramatists and playwrights
17th-century theatre managers
People from Tongcheng, Anhui
People from Huaining County